Echo is a 1997 erotic thriller film directed by Charles Correll made for TV starring Jack Wagner and Alexandra Paul. The film was also known as Deadly Echo in Canada and the United Kingdom.

Plot
Identical twins, Max and Steven Jordan (Jack Wagner), were separated at birth after a car accident that killed their parents. Max goes on to live a successful life with caring foster parents, but Steven leads a life of despair, and feels that he has been denied the life that he was entitled to, and plots revenge against his unsuspecting brother.

Steven soon gets involved in his brother's idyllic life and begins to manipulate events. In a plot twist, he eventually succeeds by manipulating his brother's wife, Olivia (Alexandra Paul) to kill her legitimate husband, thinking she is killing Steven.

At the end of the film, Olivia is pregnant with Steven's child without her knowing it.

Main cast
 Jack Wagner as Max & Steven Jordan 
 Alexandra Paul as Olivia Jordan 
 Kin Shriner as Jackson Lewis 
 Clare Carey as Tess Lewis 
 Laurie Holden as Scarlett Antonelli 
 Ray Baker as Stu Fishman 
 Teryl Rothery as Ruth Jordan 
 Anthony Harrison as Len Jordan 
 Fulvio Cecere as Lawrence Russo 
 Venus Terzo as Kathy

External links
 

1990s thriller films
1997 television films
1997 films
American thriller television films
1990s English-language films
1990s American films